Maldon is a local government district in Essex, England. The council is based in Maldon, and the district includes other notable settlements such as Burnham-on-Crouch, Heybridge, Wickham Bishops, Southminster, Tolleshunt D'Arcy and Tollesbury. The district covers the Dengie peninsula in the south, as well as the Thurstable Hundred area to the north of the Blackwater Estuary, a total area of 358.78 km2.

The district was formed on 1 April 1974 under the Local Government Act 1972   It covered the municipal borough of Maldon and urban district of Burnham-on-Crouch along with Maldon Rural District.

As of 2017, the district had an estimated population of 63,975. The majority of people live in the small rural villages, many of which have their origins in connections with the coast or agricultural economy.  Many people know the district from its association with sailing.

Politics
A subdivision of the county of Essex, the Non-metropolitan district is served by Maldon District Council.

The area is part of the parliamentary constituency of Maldon.

Maldon District Council
There are 31 seats on Maldon District Council. Elections for all seats are held every four years; the last were held in May 2019. The result at that election was 17 Conservative and 14 Independent councillors. Following resignations and splits amongst both the Conservatives and the Independent Group, and two by-elections, the political make up at January 2022 was 10 Conservative, 3 non-aligned Conservatives, 11 Independent Group, 6 non-aligned Independents, and one vacant seat. Penny Channer, a Conservative, was appointed leader of the council at a meeting on 18 January 2022, effectively leading a Conservative minority administration.

There are 29 town and parish councils.

Former leader of Maldon district council John Smith was killed along with two family members while he commanded a light aircraft flight from Oban to Andrewsfield, Essex on 9 April 2007.  An Air Accident Investigation report concluded that Smith was 5 times over the blood alcohol prescribed limit, this along with unreliable instrument readings and lack of IMC or instrument rating lead to disorientation and the crash.  Smiths health was also questioned at a coroners inquest and it was reported he was not medically cleared to fly.

History 

The first evidence of a settlement to the north of Maldon at Elms Farm is from the Middle Bronze Age 3500 years ago. From 500 BC onwards the red hills of the Crouch and Blackwater show us that there was a continuous and extensive activity in the salt making which still prospers today.

Later, during the Iron Age, about 100 BC, there was a port, set among the marshlands at the junction of the Blackwater and Chelmer rivers. This settlement may have been of regional religious significance, and there is evidence that it traded luxury goods with Europe.

Elms Farm continued as a port and market place but was clearly superseded in importance by Colchester in the 1st century AD, when Colchester became the first capital of the Roman administration.

The Romans founded Othona in the 3rd century. It was a fortress at the mouth of the Blackwater built to protect the estuary from Saxon pirates. It was here in 654 AD that St Cedd founded the church of St Peter-on-the-Wall, the oldest church in England to retain much of its original fabric.

In 664 AD St Cedd attended the Synod of Whitby which merged the Anglo-Celtic Church with the Church of Rome. Recent changes in the coastline have revealed the remains of extensive Saxon 5-7th century fish traps. The Church stands today overlooking the North Sea from whence came further invaders in the 10th century - the Danes.

In 912 AD and 914 AD Edward the Elder camped at Maldon to organise defences in the desperate fight against the Danes. In 917 AD the Saxons were defeated at Colchester and besieged at Maldon, but eventually, the Danes were defeated.

In 991 AD there was a major battle between the pillaging Danes led by Olaf Trygvassen who had already attacked Ipswich, and Earl Bryhtnoth's men who were defending Maldon on the instruction of the Saxon King Ethelred the Unready. Earl Bryhtnoth was in his sixties. The battle was recorded in a poem which is regarded as one of the finest examples of early English literature.

The famous Battle of Maldon took place beside the River Blackwater on 10 August 991, during the reign of Ethelred the Unready. The Anglo-Saxons, led by Byrhtnoth and his thegns, fought against a Viking invasion, a battle which ended in defeat for the Anglo-Saxons.

Geology, landscape and ecology
The district is in the east of Essex.  Most of the district is the Dengie peninsula. Still, a significant area is also the area above the Blackwater Estuary, bounded by the River Blackwater to the west until near Kelvedon, the boundary then continues south of Tiptree to the Salcott inlet on the Blackwater Estuary.  There are very few settlements on the boundary of the district with the North Sea, in contrast with other coastal districts of Essex, due to the Dengie Marshes.

The district has a rural character ranging from the tidal salt marshes to farmland and rolling wooded ridges.  A network of country lanes provides access to the countryside from the towns and villages.  A remote area of tidal mud-flats and saltmarshes at the eastern end of the Dengie peninsula forms the Dengie Special Protection Area.  The River Blackwater and River Crouch are of international importance for nature conservation particularly for their extensive population of wildfowl and waders.

Settlements in Maldon

Arms

References

External links
 Maldon District Council
 Burnham-on-Crouch Lifeboat
 Burnham-on-Crouch Weather Station
 Live Weather from Burnham-on-Crouch
 Christian Outreach Centre Heybridge and Maldon - a church meeting in Maldon
Maldon Town Council

 
Non-metropolitan districts of Essex